Hauraki is a former New Zealand parliamentary electorate, from 1928 to 1987 and 1993 to 1996. In the 1987 general election it was renamed Coromandel, the name that had been used from 1972 to 1981. In 1993 it reverted to Hauraki, but became Coromandel again for the first MMP election in 1996.

Population centres
In the 1927 electoral redistribution, the North Island gained a further electorate from the South Island due to faster population growth. Five electorates were abolished, two former electorates were re-established, and three electorates, including Hauraki, were created for the first time. In its original form, the electorate extended up the coast to Auckland. Settlements that fell into the Hauraki electorate were Howick, Papatoetoe, Mangere, Manurewa, Brookby, Meremere, Miranda, and Waitakaruru. In the 1937 electoral redistribution, the Hauraki electorate moved significantly south, losing all the South Auckland suburbs to the new  electorate, and gaining Morrinsville.

In the 1946 electoral redistribution, the Hauraki electorate moved to the north-east, losing Morrinsville again, but gaining Paeroa and most of the Coromandel Peninsula, including Thames, Whitianga, and Coromandel township.

The 1987 electoral redistribution took the continued population growth in the North Island into account, and two additional general electorates were created, bringing the total number of electorates to 97. In the South Island, the shift of population to Christchurch had continued. Overall, three electorates were newly created, three electorates were recreated, and four electorates were abolished (including Hauraki). All of those electorates were in the North Island. Changes in the South Island were restricted to boundary changes.

History
The electorate was represented by nine Members of Parliament. The first representative was Arthur Hall, who died in office on 18 April 1931.

In 1972 and 1987, the electorate was abolished and replaced with the  electorate.

Members of Parliament
Key

The name Hauraki was used in 1999 for a Māori electorate; please refer to Hauraki Maori.

Election results

1993 election

1984 election

1981 election

1978 election

1943 election
There were five candidates in 1943, with the election won by Andy Sutherland over Edmund Colin Nigel Robinson.

1942 by-election

1935 election

1931 election

1931 by-election

1928 election

Notes

References

Historical electorates of New Zealand
Thames-Coromandel District
1928 establishments in New Zealand
1972 disestablishments in New Zealand
1987 disestablishments in New Zealand
1996 disestablishments in New Zealand
1981 establishments in New Zealand
1993 establishments in New Zealand